The Philip Goldson Highway in Belize joins Belize City through Orange Walk Town and Corozal Town with the Mexican border at the state of Quintana Roo.

The highway was officially commissioned in 1968 as the Northern Highway.  In 1979,  of new highway brought the route much further to the west between Belize City and Orange Walk, and much closer to Crooked Tree, to which a causeway and road was built in 1984. On 21 September 2012, Prime Minister Dean Barrow announced that it would be renamed the Philip Goldson Highway, named after a Belizean activist, editor and politician.  The highway passes the international airport also named for Philip Goldson.

Junction list

See also
Transport in Belize

References

Roads in Belize